The 1983 Fort Lauderdale Strikers season was the team's third season of indoor soccer in the North American Soccer League.

Club

Roster

Coaching staff
 Head Coach:  David Chadwick
 Asst. Coach:  Bill Nuttall

Background 
The 1983 indoor season was part of the club's seventeenth season in professional soccer.  Previously, the NASL indoor season was played during the winter months and running through the new year, such as the 1981–82 season. This year, because five NASL teams elected not to play indoor while three others played in the MISL, the format changed to a round-robin tournament known as the 1983 NASL Grand Prix of Indoor Soccer. In addition to the Grand Prix, the Strikers played two friendlies, the first of which was a farewell of sorts from the briefly defunct Jacksonville Tea Men to their fans.

Review 
The team's long history of poor showings indoors looked to change this time around, because unlike in previous years most of the Strikers' marquee players decided to participate. The Grand Prix campaign started off ominously with the airline losing the team's uniforms in transit to Tulsa before their first game, and forcing them to borrow kits from their opponents.

The bad luck continued. Going into the third round of the Grand Prix, a total of 10 players were unavailable for the match. Four (Canter, Fowles, Meschbach, Savage) were trying out for Team America. Tony Whelan and Brian Kidd were battling the flu. Ken Fogarty (hamstring) and Thomas Rongen (fractured iliac) were nursing injuries, while Branko Šegota was serving a one-game red card suspension for verbally abusing a referee. Finally, Ray Hudson was in the midst of missing at least five games with a case of the mumps.

Most of this unfortunate situation happened to occur after they'd agreed to loan Keith Weller to the Roughnecks. To make matters worse, the 36 year-old Weller came alive with 8 goals and 7 assists in just six games with Tulsa. With so many line-up changes it made it nearly impossible to play with any kind of consistency. The Strikers finished the Grand Prix in fourth place. They did however reach the finals of the Molson $5,000 Shootout Challenge, which was a side competition held in conjunction with the Grand Prix.

Including friendlies, from 1977 through 1983 the Strikers posted an indoor record of 6–39, losing the final eight in a row. This would be the final year of the Fort Lauderdale Strikers as an indoor team. They sat out the 1983–84 NASL Indoor season and the club moved to Minnesota.

Statistics
Goals (worth 2 points), Assists (worth 1 point)
*includes Grand Prix and friendlies

Competitions

$5,000 Shootout Challenge
 Semi-finals: Tampa Bay 3–1 Tulsa • Fort Lauderdale 3–1 Montreal
 Finals: Tampa Bay 2–0 Fort Lauderdale

Grand Prix preliminary round results

Round 1
played at Tulsa Fairgrounds Pavilion in Tulsa, Oklahoma

Round 2
played at the Bayfront Center in St. Petersburg, Florida

Round 3
played at the Tulsa Fairgrounds Pavilion in Tulsa, Oklahoma

Standings
G = Games, W = Wins, L = Losses, GF = Goals For, GA = Goals Against, GD = Goal Differential, PTS= point system

6 points awarded for a win.
Beginning with the fourth goal, 1 bonus point awarded for each goal scored. 
Maximum of 5 bonus points per game.

*Montreal wins top seed based on 2-0 head-to-head edge over Tampa Bay

Match reports

Playoffs rounds

Semi-finals
played at the Montreal Forum in Montreal, Quebec

Third place match
played at the Montreal Forum in Montreal, Quebec (1:30 PM EDT)

Final Grand Prix Rankings

Transfers

Non-grand prix matches
Before the Grand Prix began the Strikers helped the defunct Jacksonville Tea Men say thanks and goodbye to 5,000 loyal fans in a match at the Jacksonville Coliseum. Five days after the Grand Prix concluded, the Strikers played the Tampa Bay Rowdies in an indoor friendly, in Lakeland, Florida.

Match reports

References 

1983
Fort Lauderdale Strikers
Fort Lauderdale Strikers indoor
Fort Lauderdale Strikers
1983 North American Soccer League season